Brothers of Soul was a soul trio composed of Fred Bridges, Richard Knight, and Robert Eaton, who were also a songwriting team involved with around 50 singles.  Based in Detroit in the 60's and 70's, they recorded a number of songs, mainly with producer Ric Williams for the Zodiac and Boo labels.  Their biggest hit was "I Guess That Don't Make Me a Loser," which peaked at 32 on the R&B charts in May 1968.

History
Bridges and Knight, who had met at the Dodge Assembly Plant, did some writing for La Beat Records, where they began working with Eaton.  The first song the three are credited on together is James Shorter's "Modern Day Woman".  They then got together to write a song named "Dream."  While doing some freelance work for Drew Records, writing for The Precisions, they met Chicago based producer Williams, who became interested in showcasing them as a group.  They chose to record under the name Brothers of Soul, a name inspired by the Detroit riots of '67.  Under the coordination of Williams, they wrote for Zodiac, producing many Ruby Andrews hits.  Their most successful period was from 1968-1969, with their last recordings in 1971.  Sometime during this period, Ben Knights replaced Richard Knight, who was serving time in New York.  They continued to work together, providing vocal accompaniment for a few years, eventually splitting apart.  A hits compilation named "I Guess That Don't Make Me a Loser" was released on CD in 1995 by Collectables Records and digitally in 2008 by S.D.E.G. Records.

Partial Discography

Chart Singles

Compilations
 I Guess That Don't Make Me a Loser

References

External links
 The Fred Bridges Story
 

American soul musical groups